Ratyshchi is a village (selo) in Ternopil Raion, Ternopil Oblast (province in western Ukraine). It belongs to Zaliztsi settlement hromada, one of the hromadas of Ukraine.

Local government – Ratyshchivska village council. Unto her is subordinated to the village Pishchane. The village is situated on the banks of the Seret River which is the left tributary of the Dniester.

Village Ratyshchi distant from the administrative center of Ternopil , from Zboriv — , and from Lviv — . 

The first written record dates from the 12th century.  

Until 18 July 2020, Ratyshchi belonged to Zboriv Raion. The raion was abolished in July 2020 as part of the administrative reform of Ukraine, which reduced the number of raions of Ternopil Oblast to three. The area of Zboriv Raion was merged into Ternopil Raion.

References

Notes

Sources 
 У ЗБОРОВІ ВШАНУВАЛИ РАТИЩІВСЬКУ ІКОНУ ПРЕСВЯТОЇ БОГОРОДИЦІ 
 weather.in.ua 
 Pogoda w Ratyshchi

Literature 
 

Villages in Ternopil Raion